Rasulpur Kulian  is a village in Kapurthala district of Punjab State, India. The village is administrated by a Sarpanch, who is an elected representative.

Demography 
According to the report published by Census India in 2011, Rasulpur Kulian has 2 houses with the total population of 18 persons of which 9 are male and 9 females. Literacy rate of Rasulpur Kulian is 80.00%, higher than the state average of 75.84%.  The population of children in the age group 0–6 years is 3 which is 16.67% of the total population. Child sex ratio is approximately 500, lower than the state average of 846.

Population data

References

External links
  Villages in Kapurthala
 Kapurthala Villages List

Villages in Kapurthala district